Agazzi is an Italian surname and a name of a village near Arezzo. Notable people with the surname include:

Davide Agazzi (born 1993), Italian footballer
Carlo Paolo Agazzi (1870–1922), Italian painter
Ermenegildo Agazzi (1866–1945), Italian painter
Ernesto Agazzi (born 1942), Uruguayan agronomist and politician
Evandro Agazzi (born 1934), Italian philosopher
Giancarlo Agazzi (1932–1995), Italian ice hockey player
Michael Agazzi (born 1984), Italian footballer 
Paolo Agazzi (born 1946), Italian-born Bolivian director
Rinaldo Agazzi (1857–1939), Italian painter 
Agazzi (Arezzo), Italian village near Arezzo

Italian-language surnames